Robert William Keate (16 June 1814 – 17 March 1873) was a career British colonial governor, serving as Commissioner of the Seychelles from 1850 to 1852, Governor of Trinidad from 1857 to 1864, Lieutenant-governor of the Colony of Natal from 1867 to 1872, and Governor of Gold Coast from 7 March 1873 to 17 March 1873.

Early life and family
Keate was born in 1814 in Westminster, London, one of four children of Robert Keate, the brother of John Keate. Keate was educated at Eton College and later Christ Church, Oxford.

Cricket career
Keate made his first-class debut for the Gentlemen in the 1832 Gentlemen v Players fixture. While attending Christ Church, Keate made his first-class debut for Oxford University in 1834 against the Marylebone Cricket Club. From 1834 to 1837, he represented the University in 3 first-class matches.

In 1835, he made his debut for the Marylebone Cricket Club against Cambridge University. From 1835 to 1848, he represented the club in 21 first-class matches, making his final appearance for the club against Oxford University.

In 1844, he represented Hampshire in a single first-class match against the Marylebone Cricket Club. In addition, Keate played first-class cricket for the Gentlemen of Kent, the Fast Bowlers (which indicates Keate was a quick bowler of some sort), the Gentlemen of England and an early England team against Kent in 1840.

In his overall first-class career, he scored 387 runs at a batting average of 6.14, with a high score of 30. With the ball, he took 2 wickets and in the field, he took 8 catches.

Colonial service

Commissioner of the Seychelles
In 1850, Keate was appointed as the Commissioner of the Seychelles. This was a position he held from 1850 to 1852.

Governor of Trinidad
Keate later joined the colonial civil service upon, and was sent to the West Indies in 1857 as Governor of Trinidad, a position he held from 26 January 1857 to 1864.

Lieutenant-governor of Natal
In 1867, Keate was appointed the Lieutenant-governor of the Colony of Natal, a position he held from 1867 to 1872.

Governor of Cape Coast
In 1872, Keate was appointed the Governor of the Gold Coast from 7 March 1873 to 17 March 1873. Keate died at Cape Coast Castle in the Gold Coast on 17 March 1873, just ten days into his Governorship.

References

External links
Robert William Keate at Cricinfo
Robert William Keate at CricketArchive
Matches and detailed statistics for Robert William Keate

1814 births
1873 deaths
People from Westminster
Cricketers from Greater London
Alumni of Christ Church, Oxford
English cricketers
Gentlemen cricketers
Oxford University cricketers
Marylebone Cricket Club cricketers
Hampshire cricketers
Governors of British Trinidad
Governors of Natal
Governors of the Gold Coast (British colony)
Gentlemen of Kent cricketers
English cricketers of 1826 to 1863
Gentlemen of England cricketers
Governors of British Seychelles
Governors of British Grenada
Fast v Slow cricketers